The Surf Coasters (Japanese: ザ・サーフコースターズ Za Sāfukōsutāzu) are a Japanese surf band, started by Shigeo Naka in 1994.

History

The band became known with their stint on the talent show television program Ebisu-Onsen, a show very similar in concept to the American program, Star Search on which the winning band would receive a recording contract.

Although the Surf Coasters did not win the competition, their success on the show led to a loyal fan following. They succeeded to make it into the final round of the competition, where they finished in second place; however, they still received a record deal, which led to the release of their debut CD, Surf Panic '95, which, despite being an instrumental album, sold well. The band also played that year with surf music legend and "King of the Surf Guitar", Dick Dale, who was on his first tour of Japan. Reportedly, after the tour Dale referred to Naka as the "Prince of the Surf Guitar.".

Since then, the band has released upwards of twenty records, for the Columbia, Victor and BMG record labels, and have become the number one instrumental band across Japan. Their sound has varied since 1995, including dancehall, acoustic arrangements, blues, and heavy metal. Naka has also gone on to record, with and without the rest of the band, on other musical projects, including soundtracks for film and video games. Shigeo Naka was a guest guitarist playing the song "Test Driver" and Naka's own composition, "The Clash", with Takeshi Terauchi & Blue Jeans on their 1996 album, Catch a Wave.

Kurita has been playing bass with his band Chill.

Other band members
Nobuhiro Kurita, who joined the band on bass in 1997. During the band's first American tour, Kurita was dubbed "Zen Punk" for his cartoonish presence. He began playing the bass after being encouraged to do so by a friend in junior high school.
Naotaka Seki, a drummer who was recruited by Naka into the band in 2001, while touring with Ryouchi Endo. He began drumming after seeing Munetaka Higuchi, drummer for the band Loudness, and deciding that he looked cool.

Discography

 SURF PANIC '95 (1995)
 Surfside Village (1995)
 WAITIN' 4 THE SURF (1995)
 SURFACE IMPRESSION (1996)
 Surfdelicious (1996)
 Surfin' ELVIS / THE PELVIS (1997)
 SURFDELIC (1998)
 NAKA SHIGEO plays PAUL MAURIAT (1999)
 THE SURF COASTERS (1999)
 SURF is Dead (2000)
 六人ノ刺客 (2000)
 EASTER!! (2001)
 L'esprit (2002)
 Surf Attack (2003)
 p.m. (2003)
 PRIVATE RECORDINGS vol.1 / THE SURF COASTERS featuring 中シゲヲ (2004)
 SAMURAI STRUCK (U.S.A. ISSUE) (2005)
 SAMURAI STRUCK (JAPAN ISSUE) (2005)

Best Of compilations
 FLY UP!! ～Best of The Surf Coasters Vol.1～ (2000)
 MISIRLOU 10th ANNIVERSARY BEST (2004)

Video game soundtracks
 Soundtrack from "RUNABOUT" (1997)
 SUPER RUNABOUT (1999)
 RUNABOUT3 neoAGE (2002)

DVDs
 THE SURF COASTERS ON STAGE (2004)

References

External links
Surf Coasters collection at the Internet Archive's live music archive

1994 establishments in Japan
Instrumental rock musical groups
Japanese instrumental musical groups
Japanese psychedelic rock music groups
Musical groups established in 1994
Musical groups from Tokyo
Surf music groups